Maxton is an area in the west of Dover, in the county of Kent, England. Maxton also served as the terminus of the tramway system serving the town until its closure in 1938.

Maxton is now a suburb of Dover.

References

External links

Villages in Kent
Dover, Kent